Hung Vương High School, is an 85-year-old public high school in Ho Chi Minh City of Vietnam. It was founded in 1934.

History
Since the day of foundation, the school has changed its name many times, like Cho Lon Primary School, Do Huu Phuong Primary School and now it has been named Hùng Vương High School.  Hung Vuong is known for its good teachers who possess high teaching skills and its disciplines. Many high-ranking official people in Vietnam graduated from the school and it became famous to a lot of parents from District 1, Ho Chi Minh City, District 3, Ho Chi Minh City, District 5, Ho Chi Minh City, District 6, Ho Chi Minh City, District 8, Ho Chi Minh City, District 10, Ho Chi Minh City and District 11, Ho Chi Minh City.

Location 
It is located in the center of District 5, a Chinatown of Ho Chi Minh City, Ho Chi Minh City.  This school is between two hospitals: Ho Chi Minh City Medicine and Pharmacy University and Pham Ngoc Thach University of Medicine. The address is: 124 Hong Bang Street, Ward 12, Dist. 5.

Ranking 
Hùng Vương High School is in the top 100 best high schools in the country. From 2014 to 2015, it successfully admitted more than 3000 students.

Admission 
Students need to have higher academic scores in their previous school exams to apply to this high school. Students need to get an aggregate of more than 85% on their previous exam.

Uniform 
The uniform consists of white shirt, gray pants for boys and gray skirt for girls. However, on Monday and Thursday, the girls need to wear traditional Vietnamese dresses.

Education 
Hùng Vương High School offers its courses to students from grades 10 to 12. Each grade has 25 classes and one special class for the distinction group. This group has specialized training in subjects like Mathematics, Physics and Chemistry.

Infrastructure 
This school has a well equipped Chemistry, Physics and Computer lab. The school also has a large kitchen for the students to learn how to cook. It houses a mini football field and basketball field.

Sports and Events 
Hùng Vương High School often arranges various sports events throughout the year. Students from each class have to choose their nominee for their team before the competition. Football, basketball, table tennis and chess are the most common sports in the school. 
The most important of all the events held in the school is the school's "Fun Fair". On that day, teachers and students organize a number of stores. In each class, they have to prepare food and drinks to sell.

Faculty
Coordinator 
Nguyễn Vân Yên
Sub Coordinator
LÊ QUANG HUY
DƯƠNG HOÀI BẢO
LÝ THỊ MỸ LỆ 
The school has 70 teachers. The faculty consists of forty-one non-teaching staff helping in the school's management.

Notable alumni 
Singers
Thanh Thảo
Yến Trang
Ái Phương
Sports
Lâm Đông Vượng: First position holder in Vovinam at the 2009 Asian Indoor Games
MC
Trấn Thành
Actor
Anh Đức

References 

Schools in Vietnam
1934 establishments in Vietnam